Płonka-Kozły  is a village in the administrative district of Gmina Łapy. It is within Białystok County, Podlaskie Voivodeship, in north-eastern Poland.

References

Villages in Białystok County